Brujas may refer to:

 Brujas F.C., association football team
 Brujas (TV series), television series
 Brujas (film), a 1996 Spanish drama film
 Brujas, Panama, city in Panama
 Bruja (novel), horror novel
 Brujas (album), a 2013 album by Mala Rodriguez
 Brujas (skate crew), Bronx-based skateboarding collective
 Brujería, the Spanish word for "witchcraft"
 Brujas (moth), a synonym for the moth genus Hemeroblemma
 Spanish name of the Belgian town of Bruges